Maria Sofia Angela "Angelique" Magito (1809–1895) was a Swedish opera singer, concert singer, and stage actress.  She was one of the best-known artists of the travelling countryside theatres in Sweden and was called the "opera singer of the countryside".

Life

Angelique Magito was born in Uppsala to an Italian member of the Svea Artillery Regiment, Pietro Magito.  She became a student of the Royal Swedish Opera in 1817, where she was a student of Maria Franck and Karl Magnus Craelius. She made her debut at a concert at the German Church in Norrköping in 1826.

Magito was a member of a number of travelling theatre companies touring the countryside all over Sweden, most notably that of Erik Djurström and Charlotta Djurström between 1832 and 1850. She successfully performed as a singer when the theater company offered operatic and other lyric performances.  Initially she performed the singing parts for Charlotta Djurström, but she was soon allowed to perform herself and became a very popular and well-known singer of the travelling countryside theater. She was described as a "Southern beauty" who became plump early on.

Magito had several children with a colleague. In 1855, she married the officer Ture Jerving and retired from stage. After her marriage, she remained active as a popular singer at church concerts. Following the death of her husband in 1883, however, she was placed in the poor house.

Legacy
Angelique Magito is mentioned in the song En glad själs hem by Johan Gustaf Schultz.

References 

 Nordensvan, Georg, Svensk teater och svenska skådespelare från Gustav III till våra dagar. Förra delen, 1842–1918, Bonnier, Stockholm, 1917 ['Swedish theatre and Swedish actors from Gustav III to our days. First Book 1772–1842'] 
 Dahl, Torsten, Svenska män och kvinnor
 

1809 births
1895 deaths
19th-century Swedish actresses
Swedish stage actresses
Swedish people of Italian descent
19th-century Swedish women opera singers